Dreibelbis  is an unincorporated community in Greenwich Township in Berks County, Pennsylvania, United States.

References

Unincorporated communities in Berks County, Pennsylvania
Unincorporated communities in Pennsylvania